Wonbuk station is a defunct railway station on the Gyeongjeon Line in South Korea.

Further reading

Defunct railway stations in South Korea